Alfajor de Trujillo is a typical kind of alfajor from Trujillo, a Peruvian city. The alfajor de Trujillo is manufactured since old times and has several layers and it can be of different sizes and shapes as round or square. It is made mainly with products as flour, butter, eggs and milk, filled with milk candy, some pineapple sweet and in some cases peanuts, with cookies within its layers. The most famous company manufacturing this products in Trujillo is Dulcería Castañeda. It is one of the products presented in the Gastronomic Fair in Trujillo.

Variants of the alfajor de Trujillo
Some of the most popular are the following variants:
Alfajor Castañeda, it is made in Trujillo city and manufactured by Dulcería Castañeda.
King Kong milk candy, it is made in Trujillo city and also in Lambayeque city.

See also
Gastronomic Fair in Trujillo
Marinera Festival
Trujillo Spring Festival

References

External links
Location of Trujillo city (Wikimapia)
Alfajor Castañeda

Media

Gallery of images
Cultural Promotion Center of Trujillo

Cuisine of Trujillo, Peru